Jorginho dos Santos Mello (born 17 August 1967), is a Brazilian politician who is the governor of Santa Catarina, having won the 2022 election in the state of Santa Catarina. An ally of Jair Bolsonaro, Mello previously served as Senator for Santa Catarina from 2019-2022.

References 

1956 births
Governors of Santa Catarina (state)
Liberal Party (Brazil, 2006) politicians
Living people
Members of the Federal Senate (Brazil)